CYCC may refer to:

 Chiayi City Council, a local council in Taiwan
 The ICAO code for Cornwall Regional Airport
 CYCC (gene), see List of notable genes